Kalocyrma epileuca is a moth in the family Lecithoceridae. It was described by Chun-Sheng Wu and Kyu-Tek Park in 1999. It is found in Sri Lanka.

The wingspan is about 9 mm. The forewings are milky white with a brownish pattern. The cell dot is small and there are two well-defined discal spots. The hindwings are light brown.

Etymology
The species name is derived from Greek epileucos (meaning whitish).

References

Moths described in 1999
Kalocyrma